Rodjana Chuthabunditkul (born 14 August 1991) is a Thai badminton player. She won the 2009 BWF World Junior Championships in mixed doubles, playing with Maneepong Jongjit.

Achievements

BWF World Junior Championships 
Women's doubles

Mixed doubles

Asia Junior Championships
Girls' doubles

Mixed doubles

BWF International Challenge/Series
Women's doubles

Mixed doubles

 BWF International Challenge tournament
 BWF International Series tournament
 BWF Future Series tournament

References

External links 
 

Rodjana Chuthabunditkul
Rodjana Chuthabunditkul
Living people
1991 births
Rodjana Chuthabunditkul